Grazzano Badoglio (Grazzano Monferrato until 1939) is a comune (municipality) in the Province of Asti in the Italian region Piedmont, located about  east of Turin and about  northeast of Asti.  Grazzano, which developed round the abbey founded in 961 by Aleramo, Marquess of Montferrat, was the birthplace of Pietro Badoglio, for whom it was later renamed.

References

External links